The Windows 11 2022 Update (also known as version 22H2 and codenamed "Sun Valley 2") is the first and current major update to Windows 11. It carries the build number 10.0.22621.

Version history 
The first preview was released to Insiders who opted in to the Dev Channel on September 2, 2021. The update began rolling out on September 20, 2022. Notable changes in the 2022 Update include:

 Redesigned and new Efficiency mode feature in Task Manager
 Re-added the drag and drop feature on the taskbar
 Improvement to the snap layout experience
 New live captions feature
 New Smart App Control (SAC) feature for blocking untrusted applications
 Split "Focus assist" feature into "Do not disturb" and "Focus"
 Included Clipchamp as inbox app

As of build 22567, the version string has been changed from "Dev" to "22H2".

October 2022 component update 
The first component update to Windows 11, version 22H2, codenamed "Moment 1", was released on October 18, 2022 with build 22621.675 and several further changes:

 New tabbed browsing feature and refreshed layout of the left navigation pane in the File Explorer
 New inline suggested actions feature
 Re-introduced taskbar overflow feature
 Improvements to the built-in Windows share window

February 2023 component update 
The second component update to Windows 11, version 22H2, codenamed "Moment 2," was released on February 28, 2023 with build 22621.1344 and several further changes:

 Added iOS support in the Phone Link app
 New Studio Effects section in the Quick Settings for NPU-compatible devices
 Redesigned Quick Assist app
 Added third-party apps support in the Widgets panel
 Re-introduced tablet-optimized taskbar
 Added support for tabs in the Notepad app
 New Braille displays and input/output languages support in Narrator
 New Energy Recommendations page in the Settings app
 Updated touch keyboard option in the Settings app
 New Tamil Anjal keyboard
 Re-introduced the search box on the taskbar

Public Patches

Future component update

See also 

 Windows 11
 Windows 11 version history
 Windows 11, version 21H2
 Windows 10 version history

References

External links
 Windows release health
 Flight Hub

Windows 11
History of Microsoft
Software version histories
Tablet operating systems
